Colipa is a small town in the Mexican state of Veracruz. It has a population of about 3,000. The weather is generally hot and the rainy season runs from October through December.

Colipa is also a great town. Is known for their industry with the "comales" Also one of the greatest things to go and explore is "el Cerrito" and el posito" Also "el rio" it's also a great thing to go! Colipa is unforgettable! 

It is located at 19°55' N, 96°42' W, less than 20 km from the Gulf Coast.

External links 
  Municipal Official Information

Populated places in Veracruz